Thomas Jefferson University Hospitals Inc, branded as Jefferson Health, is a multi-state non-profit health system whose flagship hospital is Thomas Jefferson University Hospital in Center City, Philadelphia. The health system's hospitals serve as the teaching hospitals of Thomas Jefferson University. Thomas Jefferson University and Jefferson Health are integrated together as two arms of the same organization. It has a single board of directors and produces joint financial statements. The CEO of Thomas Jefferson University and Jefferson Health is Joseph G. Cacchione, MD.

History
Formerly a division of Thomas Jefferson University, the hospital was separated from the university to become a founding member of the Jefferson Health system in 1995. The Hospital merged with Methodist Hospital as a division of Thomas Jefferson University Hospitals in 1996. In March 2014, the Jefferson Health System was dissolved. In July 2016, Aria Health and Jefferson Health System announced an official merger.

For fiscal year ending June 30, 2017, Thomas Jefferson University Hospitals had 937 licensed beds, 41,368 admissions, 1,350,317 outpatient visits, 117,746 emergency room visits, 9,500 full- and part-time employees, 873 house staff, 1,667* medical staff, and 3,265 full- and part-time registered nurses. (*Includes other professional personnel including psychologists, podiatrists, NPs, PAs, CRNAs, etc.)

In July 2017, Thomas Jefferson University and Philadelphia University combined to create the newly named Thomas Jefferson University.

In 2018, Jefferson Health reach a conclusive agreement to merge with the Einstein Healthcare Network. The merger created an 18-hospital system and $5.9 billion in revenue including over "50 outpatient and urgent-care centers, leading rehabilitation and post-acute facilities" and maintained almost 39,000 employees. In 2020, the Federal Trade Commission attempted to block the merger.

Hospitals
 
Jefferson Health comprises the hospitals of:

 Thomas Jefferson University Hospital
 Jefferson Hospital for Neuroscience
 Jefferson Methodist Hospital
 Jefferson Abington Hospital (formerly Abington Memorial Hospital)
 Jefferson Bucks Hospital (formerly part of Aria Health)
 Jefferson Cherry Hill Hospital (formerly Kennedy Hospital and prior that Cherry Hill Medical Center)
 Jefferson Frankford Hospital (formerly part of Aria Health)
 Jefferson Lansdale Hospital
 Jefferson Stratford Hospital 
 Jefferson Torresdale Hospital (formerly part of Aria Health)
 Jefferson Washington Township Hospital
 Magee Rehabilitation Hospital
 Physicians Care Surgical Hospital
 Rothman Orthopaedic Specialty Hospital – Bensalem
Einstein Medical Center Philadelphia
Einstein Medical Center Montgomery
Einstein Medical Center Elkins Park 
MossRehab

Departments and services
Thomas Jefferson University Hospitals provides medical services across more than 200 specialized centers, programs, departments and divisions.

Thomas Jefferson University Hospitals has an Office of Human Research/Division of Clinical Trials Support to assist with the formal clinical trials in which the organization is involved.

Five of the seven physicians on the staff of the Philadelphia Eagles NFL team are doctors at Thomas Jefferson University Hospitals.  In 2015, Alexander Vaccaro was named the President of the Rothman Institute.

See also
 List of hospitals in Pennsylvania

References

External links
 Thomas Jefferson University Hospital
 Jefferson Health System

Healthcare in Philadelphia
Hospital networks in the United States
Medical and health organizations based in Pennsylvania